Xinguo Station is a station of Line 3, Suzhou Rail Transit. The station is located in Gusu District, Suzhou. It has been in use since December 25, 2019; when Line 3 first opened to the public. It is the only station of Line 3 to be located in Gusu District, with all preceding stations being found in Huqiu District, and all following stations located in either Wuzhong District or Suzhou Industrial Park.

References 

Railway stations in Jiangsu
Suzhou Rail Transit stations
Railway stations in China opened in 2019